Autoimmune Polyendocrine Syndrome, Type III (APS III) is a multi-system autoimmune disease characterized by lymphocytic infiltration of multiple endocrine and non-endocrine glands. In APS III, autoimmune thyroiditis must be present, but the adrenal cortex is not involved.

References

External links 

Autoimmune diseases
Endocrine diseases
Syndromes